The 1999 Carlisle City Council election took place on 6 May 1999 to elect members of Carlisle District Council in Cumbria, England. The whole council was up for election after boundary changes increased the number of seats by one. The Conservative Party gained overall control of the council from the Labour Party.

Election result

References

1999 English local elections
1999
1990s in Cumbria